Right to quote or right of quotation or quotation right is one of the copyright exceptions provided by the Berne Convention, article 10: "It shall be permissible to make quotations ... provided that their making is compatible with fair practice, and their extent does not exceed that justified by the purpose". With different language, it was already present in the 1908 revision of the treaty.

Implementation 

National legislations usually embody the Berne Convention limits in one or more of the following requirements:
 the cited paragraphs are within a reasonable limit (varying from country to country),
 clearly marked as quotations and fully referenced, 
 the resulting new work is not just a collection of quotations, but constitutes a fully original work in itself.
In some countries the intended use of the work (educational, scientific, parodist, etc.) may also be a factor determining the scope of this right.

Europe 

The right to quote is especially important in continental Europe copyright law, where it covers some of the practices known elsewhere as fair dealing. European jurisprudence is gradually extending the number of uses permitted under the right to quote, with some limits.

France
In France, it is illegal to reproduce someone's work without their approval. But if the work is published, i.e. no longer being edited prior to release, small quotations are legal.

Germany
In Germany, the right to quote is extended considerably for research purposes and may even encompass complete works (e. g. texts, pictures, music or videos).

Poland
In Poland, the right to quote allows quotation of excerpts of works and small works as a whole, provided that this is justified by teaching, review, explanation or caricatural motivation.

See also
 Fair dealing
 Fair use
 Quotation

References

Copyright law

Rights